Canadensis is a New Latin term meaning of Canada, used in taxonomy  to denote species indigenous to or strongly associated with Canada.

Mammals
Castor canadensis, common names American beaver, Canadian beaver, or North American beaver
Cervus canadensis, common name elk or wapiti
Lontra canadensis, common name northern river otter or North American river otter
Lynx canadensis, common name Canadian lynx
Ovis canadensis, common name bighorn sheep

Birds
Aquila chrysaetos canadensis, common name golden eagle
Branta canadensis, common name Canada goose
Branta hutchinsii or Branta canadensis hutchinsii, common name cackling goose
Falcipennis canadensis, common name spruce grouse or Canada grouse
Grus canadensis, common name sandhill crane
Perisoreus canadensis, common name Canada jay, moosebird, or gray jay
Sakesphorus canadensis, common name black-crested antshrike
Sitta canadensis, common name red-breasted nuthatch
Cardellina canadensis, common name Canada warbler
Caryothraustes canadensis, common name yellow-green grosbeak

Fish
Sander canadensis, common name sauger

Insects
Argyresthia canadensis, a moth with common name Canadian arborvitae leafminer or cedar leafminer
Calyptra canadensis, a moth with common name Canadian owlet
Harpagoxenus canadensis, a species of ant
Ochlerotatus canadensis, a species of mosquito
Papilio canadensis, a butterfly with common name Canadian tiger swallowtail
Sphinx canadensis, a moth with common name Canadian sphinx
Tephronota canadensis, a species of fly
Trypeta canadensis, a species of fly
Zeiraphera canadensis, a moth with common name spruce bud moth

The red paper wasp Polistes canadensis was incorrectly classified by Carl Linnaeus in 1758 because he had been misinformed about the source location of the specimen.

Nematodes
Heterodera canadensis, a plant pathogen

Plants
Allium canadense, common name wild onion, meadow garlic, tree onion, and Canadian garlic
Amelanchier canadensis, with many common names, including Canadian serviceberry, Juneberry, shadblow serviceberry, shadblow, shadbush, shadbush serviceberry, sugarplum, thicket serviceberry
Anemone canadensis, a synonym of Anemonastrum canadense, common name Canada anemone
Antennaria canadensis, a subspecies of Antennaria howellii, common name Canada pussytoes
Aquilegia canadensis, common name wild columbine, Canadian columbine, or red columbine
Arabis canadensis, common name sicklepod
Astragalus canadensis, common name milk-vetch
Bromus ciliatus or Bromus canadensis, common name fringed brome
Calamagrostis canadensis, common name Canada bluejoint, Canada reedgrass, Langsdorff's reedgrass, or Macoun's reedgrass
Cercis canadensis, common name eastern redbud
Circaea canadensis
Collinsonia canadensis, with many common names, including Canada horsebalm, richweed, hardhack, heal-all, horseweed, ox-balm and stone root
Conyza canadensis, with many common names, including horseweed, Canadian horseweed, Canadian fleabane, coltstail, marestail and butterweed
Cornus canadensis, common name Canadian dwarf cornel, Canadian bunchberry or crackerberry
Cryptotaenia canadensis, common name Canada honewort
Dicentra canadensis, common name squirrel corn
Elodea canadensis, common name American waterweed, common waterweed, or Canadian waterweed and Anacharis
Elymus canadensis, common name Canada wild rye
Hydrastis canadensis, common name goldenseal, orange-root, or orangeroot
Lactuca canadensis, a variety of lettuce with multiple sub-species, with common names Canada lettuce, Florida blue lettuce, and wild lettuce
Laportea canadensis, common name wood nettle
Mentha canadensis, a species of mint
Nuttallanthus canadensis or Linaria canadensis, with many common names, including blue toad-flax, blue toadflax, old-field toadflax, toad-flax
Pedicularis canadensis, common name wood betony and Canada lousewort
Sambucus canadensis, common name American elderberry
Sanguinaria canadensis, common name bloodroot
Sanguisorba canadensis, common name Canadian burnet
Sanicula canadensis, common name black snakeroot
Shepherdia canadensis, common name Canada buffaloberry
Solidago canadensis, common name Canada golden-rod or Canada goldenrod
Stipa canadensis, common name feather grass, needle grass, and spear grass
Taxus canadensis, common name Canadian yew
Tsuga canadensis, common name eastern hemlock or Canadian hemlock
Viola canadensis, common name Canadian white violet, Canada violet, tall white violet, or white violet

Other
Extinct species include:
Anomalocaris canadensis, or anomalous shrimp
Bothriolepis canadensis, a Late Devonian species of placoderm fish
Brachylophosaurus canadensis, a mid-sized member of the hadrosaurid family of dinosaurs
Grewingkia canadensis, a species of prehistoric coral
Leidyosuchus canadensis, an alligatorid
Monoclonius canadensis, included with Chasmosaurus canadensis
Pachyrhinosaurus canadensis, an ornithischian dinosaur from the Late Cretaceous period
Palaeosaniwa canadensis, a carnivorous lizard from the Late Cretaceous period
Plumulites canadensis, an annelid worm and member of the machaeridian family
Xanioascus canadensis, a ctenophore

Pathogens:
Typhula ishikariensis var. canadensis

See also
 Canadensis, Pennsylvania, United States, in Monroe County
 Including use as a species name
 Including use as a species name
 Atlantic whitefish, binomial name Coregonus huntsmani, was once known as Coregonus canadensis until it was reclassified in 1987